Attorney General O'Brien may refer to:

Denis O'Brien (politician) (1837–1909), Attorney General of New York
Ignatius O'Brien, 1st Baron Shandon (1857–1930), Attorney General for Ireland
Peter O'Brien, 1st Baron O'Brien (1842–1914), Attorney General for Ireland

See also
General O'Brien (disambiguation)